"Queers Read This" (also stylized "QUEERS READ THIS!") is an essay about queer identity. The polemic was originally circulated by members of Queer Nation as a pamphlet at the June 1990 New York Gay Pride Parade. It characterizes queerness as a community based on social situation and action, in contrast to gay and lesbian identity which are considered to be based on "natural" or inherent characteristics, and suggests that to be queer is to constantly fight against oppression.

Many of the concepts initially articulated in "Queers Read This" were later elaborated on by scholars of queer theory.

Background 

The term queer was initially used as a pejorative against LGBT people. In the late 1980s, the term began to be reappropriated by activists. This reappropriation, especially popular among people of color, was associated with radical politics and rejection of liberal conservatism in the LGBT community.

The period during which "Queers Read This" was written was characterized by heterosexism and homophobia, the HIV/AIDS epidemic in the United States, and frequent discriminatory violence on the basis of sexual orientation and gender expression. By early April of 1990, instances of violence against LGBT people had increased 122 percent from the start of the same year, prompting the creation of direct action group Queer Nation by members of ACT UP.

Publication 
It is unclear who wrote "Queers Read This". The byline on the original essay reads "published anonymously by queers", and Queer Nation did not explicitly claim responsibility for the piece; it was controversial within the group as some interpreted it as advocating queer separatism or anti-heterosexual sentiment. However, the essay was generally attributed to Queer Nation and understood as an explanation of the group's purpose.

Members of Queer Nation first circulated "Queers Read This" in pamphlet form at the June 1990 New York Gay Pride Parade. Roughly 15,000 copies of the essay were distributed by a group marching with the ACT UP contingent in the parade.

Content 

"Queers Read This" uses informal and accessible language. It includes many concepts on which the field of queer theory, nascent at the time the piece was written, would later elaborate. It additionally addresses the HIV/AIDS epidemic in the United States and the lack of an effective response to the epidemic at the time of writing. Speaking to conservative and disengaged LGBT people along with politically active queers, and including multiple separate but overlapping sections with diverse voices, the essay takes a consistently polemic tone in asserting that queer existence is political and revolutionary in and of itself.

The essay characterizes queer identity not only as an expression of sexual orientation but also a commitment to specific action. It calls for LGBT pride and encourages the reader to "tear yourself away from your customary state of acceptance". A section focused on lesbian visibility asserts that queer women should involve themselves in revolution: "Girl, you can't wait for other dykes to make the world safe for you. Stop waiting for a better more lesbian future! The revolution could be here if we started it."

An additional theme in the essay is the concept of queerness as a community accessible through choice and action, rather than a group demarcated by inherent characteristics. Queer identity is thus contrasted with gay or lesbian identity.

Identity and the term queer 
The essay's use of the term queer and conceptualization of queer identity alienated some potential readers when it was initially distributed; journalist Esther Kaplan noted that some parade-goers refused to take a copy of the pamphlet because it used the word. According to E. J. Rand, the effect of the title "Queers Read This" is that anyone reading the essay "must accept, no matter how momentarily or skeptically, being named as a queer". The use of the term queer is justified in the essay itself as follows, in a section titled "Why Queer":

This framing of queerness as a marginalized identity, and constitution of the reader as a member of that marginalized group, provides a basis for the text's view as to what queerness means and should mean. At one point the essay asserts that "being queer is not about a right to privacy; it is about the freedom to be public, to just be who we are. It means everyday fighting oppression; homophobia, racism, misogyny, the bigotry of religious hypocrites and our own self-hatred."

Reception 
Queer Nation's distribution of "Queers Read This" at the 1990 pride parade, and subsequent press coverage, established the group's public reputation. The flyer was controversial within the group itself, and some people at the parade objected to its use of the term queer.

References

External links 
 PDF scan of "Queers Read This" as originally published, via the Against Equality digital archive

1990 essays
Queer theory
1990s LGBT literature
Pamphlets
Works published anonymously